In 2006 in NASCAR, the National Association for Stock Car Auto Racing (NASCAR) sanctioned three national touring series, eight regional touring series, and the Dodge Weekly Series for local competition. NASCAR champions in 2006 were Jimmie Johnson, Kevin Harvick, Todd Bodine, Eric Holmes, Mike Olsen, Mike Stefanik, Junior Miller, Tim Schendel, Gary Lewis, J. R. Norris, Rip Michels, and Philip Morris.

National touring series

Nextel Cup Series

Top ten drivers standings

Busch Series

Top ten drivers standings

Craftsman Truck Series

Top ten drivers standings

Regional touring series

AutoZone West Series

Top ten drivers standings

References
Citations

Bibliography

 
NASCAR seasons